The South East Melbourne Phoenix are an Australian professional basketball team based in Melbourne, Australia, and play in the National Basketball League. The team was established in 2019, and they play their regular season games at John Cain Arena and the State Basketball Centre.

The following is a list of all the players, both past and current, who have appeared in at least one game or have signed with the club. (Updated 13 August 2021)

2020s

Players 

 Xavier Munford

Coaching Staff

References

South East Melbourne Phoenix
National Basketball League (Australia)
National Basketball League (Australia) all-time rosters